Werner Protzel (born 5 October 1973) is a German footballer.

References

External links

1973 births
Living people
German footballers
Germany youth international footballers
FC Bayern Munich II players
SV Waldhof Mannheim players
Stuttgarter Kickers players
SV Sandhausen players
2. Bundesliga players
Association football midfielders
People from Rosenheim
Sportspeople from Upper Bavaria
Footballers from Bavaria